Wahl Street is an American television series created by Mark Wahlberg, Stephen Levinson, and Archie Gips that premiered on HBO Max on April 15, 2021. It follows the A-list actor Mark Wahlberg's businesses and investments as well as provides a glimpse into the characters who make up Wahlberg's real-life Entourage. The series was renewed for a second season in August 2021, which premiered in October 2022.

Cast

Producers 

 Mark Wahlberg, actor, producer, investor
 Stephen Levinson, Mark’s long-time manager and producing partner
 Archie Gips, President of Unrealistic Ideas

Cast 

 Harry Arnett, Co-Founder & CEO of Municipal
 Franklin D. Azar, Attorney and Investor in F45
 Cindy Cassel, Estate Manager for Wahlberg Family
 Tony Cervone, Producer, Director, and Writer at Warner Bros. Animation
 Jake Chasan, Investment Banker at Goldman Sachs
 Ryan Choi, Investor and Franchisee of F45
 Nino Cutaro, Investor and Franchisee of Wahlburgers
 Kimberly Dippel, Senior Designer at Municipal
 Tom Dowd, CEO of Performance Inspired Nutrition
 Lawrence Duram, Celebrity Chef and Personal Chef to Mark Wahlberg
 Jay Feldman, Partner in Mark Wahlberg Automotive Group
 Janice Bryant Howroyd, CEO of ActOne Group
 Daymond John, Shark Tank Shark, Investor and Television Personality
 James Lee Hernandez, Emmy-winning filmmaker and Editor of McMillions
 Emmanuel Lemelson, Greek Orthodox Priest and Hedge Fund Manager
 Liam McKiernan, Screenwriter, Director, Producer
 Mike Raymond, Investor and Board Member of F45
 Anthony 'Ace' Thomas, Mark's Friend and Member of the Funky Bunch
 Phil 'Rasta Phil' Thomas, Mark's friend and Reggae Master
 Paul Wahlberg, Chef and Co-founder of Wahlburgers
 Jeffrey M. Werner, Emmy-winning film editor
 Dana White, President of Ultimate Fighting Championship (UFC)

Advisers 

 Michael Rubin, CEO of Fanatics
 Anne Wojcicki, Co-Founder & CEO of 23andMe
 Robert Earl, Founder of Earl Enterprises & Planet Hollywood International
 Byron Allen, Founder, Chairman & CEO of Allen Media Group
 Jeanie Buss, Governor & Co-Owner of Los Angeles Lakers
 Daniel Lubetzky, Founder of Kind Snacks
 Michele Ghee, CEO of Ebony Media Group
 Mark Cuban, Entrepreneur
 Tyler Perry, Founder & CEO of Tyler Perry Studios

Ventures 

 F45, a fast-growing chain of gyms providing workouts through its digitally-connected network of studios. The Initial Public Offering (IPO) of F45 is chronicled on the show, with Mark Wahlberg working with Goldman Sachs to take the company public and ringing the opening bell at the New York Stock Exchange (NYSE).
 Municipal, an athleisure clothing company designed to look cool, fit, and feel great.
 Mark Wahlberg Auto Group, a group of automotive dealerships
 Unrealistic Ideas, a production company for unscripted/nonfiction ideas, such as docuseries and podcasts
 Wahlburgers, a "family-owned" restaurant chain initially featured in television show Wahlburgers
 Closest To The Whole, a film and TV production company for scripted content
 AQUAhydrate, a water company
 Performance Inspired, a nutrition company

Episodes

Season 1

Season 2

Production 
The series was greenlit by HBO on March 10, 2020 for its first season. According to The Wall Street Journal, Wahl Street was one of the "first business documentaries to emerge from the COVID-19 shutdown" and continued to keep the production going in the months of lockdown.

The series premiered on April 15, 2021. In August 2021, the series was renewed for a second season, which premiered in October 2022.

Reception 
The Chicago Sun Times called the series "entertaining" and Vox noted the show is a "...dive into what it’s like to be a celebrity who is also trying to have a hand in a bunch of businesses when a pandemic hits." The Wall Street Journal published that "[Wahl Street] is a survival story whose themes many business owners will recognize after the losses of the past year." In The Hollywood Reporter, HBO Max noted the series is an "intimate exploration behind the drive that makes Mark Wahlberg one of the most unique stars in entertainment." Boston.com mentioned that the show "makes reference to HBO's former hit series Entourage," the hit television series and movie that was produced by Wahlberg and inspired by his early career in the media industry while allowing viewers to meet the "characters that make up Marky Mark's real-life entourage."

References 


External links 
 
 Wahl Street on HBO Max

HBO Max original programming
Wahlberg family